Duje Mrdeša (born 14 June 1997) is a Croatian footballer who currently plays as a midfielder for Croatian third tier-side NK Bedem Ivankovo.

Career
At the end of January 2019, Mrdeša re-joined Bedem Ivankovo.

References

External links
 

1997 births
Living people
Sportspeople from Vinkovci
Association football midfielders
Croatian footballers
Croatia under-21 international footballers
HNK Rijeka II players
HNK Cibalia players
PFC Lokomotiv Plovdiv players
Croatian Football League players
Second Football League (Croatia) players
Croatian expatriate footballers
Expatriate footballers in Bulgaria
Croatian expatriate sportspeople in Bulgaria